The Reef Islands are a loose collection of 16 islands in the northwestern part of the Solomon Islands province of Temotu.  These islands have historically also been known by the names of Swallow Islands and Matema Islands.

Geography
The center of the group is at approximately 10°12'36" S lat., 166°10'12" E. long. The islands are raised some five metres on the east and tilted west. The islands are subject to tidal surges caused by cyclones and volcanic activity from nearby Tinakula volcano. The island soils are shallow yet fertile.

The islands or atolls of the group are:
Lomlom
Nifiloli
Fenualoa
Ngalo
Ngawa
Ngandeli
Nibanga Temau
Nibanga Nendi
Matema Island
Ngatendo
Pigeon Island.

About  to the south of this shoal are 4 small coral reefs:
Malani
Malim
Manuwa
Matumbi.

Separated from these groups are what are called the "outer islands":
Nalongo and Nupani at 10°6'36" S. lat., 165°19'12" E. long., located at about 75 km (45 mi.) northwest of the main group
Nukapu located about 35 km (21 mi.) to the northwest of the main group
Makalom about 17 km (10 mi.) to the northwest of the main group
Pileni about 9 km (5.5 mi.) to the northwest of the main group
Patteson Shoal about 100 km (60 mi.) away from the main group

Population and languages
The total population of the Reef Islands is about 5,600, according to 2003 estimates. This includes a Polynesian community, believed to be descendants of people from northern Tuvalu.

Two very different languages are spoken in the Reef Islands, both Oceanic, yet genealogically and typologically very different. The inhabitants of Pileni, Matema, Nupani and Nukapu, speak Vaeakau-Taumako (a.k.a. Pileni), a Polynesian outlier language. The remaining Melanesian (non-Polynesian) population speaks Äiwoo, a member of the Reefs–Santa Cruz group of Oceanic.

See also
Oceania
Pacific Islands
Pacific Ocean

Notes

References
Santa Cruz and the Reef Islands, 1908 account by W. C. O'Ferrall, Anglican missionary from 1897 to 1904.

Bodies of water of the Solomon Islands
Islands of the Solomon Islands
Archipelagoes of the Pacific Ocean